The U.S. state of New Jersey first required its residents to register their motor vehicles in 1903. Registrants provided their own license plates for display until 1908, when the state began to issue plates.

, plates are issued by the New Jersey Motor Vehicle Commission. Front and rear plates are required for most classes of vehicles, while only rear plates are required for motorcycles and trailers.

Validation
In 1999 the state tried re-validating plates with stickers, but that scheme ended in 2004 with stickers issued to expire in 2005. Some non-passenger plates stickers extended to 2010 with stickers issued to expire in 2011 (2014 for trailer plates only). Since then passenger and non-passenger plates have been re-validated with just the registration card issued to the driver.

Passenger baseplates

1908 to 1958
The first New Jersey license plate that complied with these standards was a modification of the 1952 plate, introduced in 1956.

No slogans were used on passenger plates during the period covered by this subsection.

1959 to present
All passenger plates from 1959 until present are still valid, provided they have been continuously registered. It is also possible to have a serial from an older plate remade on a plate of a newer design.

Courtesy plates

Courtesy plates have been issued to individuals with political connections since 1920. The current serial formats on these plates consist of three letters followed or preceded by a number between 1 and 20. On standard courtesy plates the first letter is a county code, the second letter is the first initial of the vehicle owner's name, and the third letter is the initial of the last name of the vehicle owner. Courtesy plates may also be personalized, with all three letters making up the owner's initials.

Courtesy plates can be used on several types of vehicles, including cars, motorcycles and historic vehicles. They must be approved by a NJ State Senator from the applicant's election district prior to being submitted to the MVC. The staff for the applicant's senator must also get approval from the state senator from the county that corresponds to the first letter on the plate being requested. The letter Q cannot be used on these plates, and D, O, T, and X cannot be used as the first letter.

Courtesy plate county codes 1959 to present

Current plate types
All bases of all classes of plates from 1959 to present are still valid for display in New Jersey.

Non-Passenger

Discontinued

Governmental

Professional

Organizational

Military and Veteran

College and University Optionals

Specialty

Sports
The New Jersey sports plates were introduced in the fall of 2010. They share a common serial format – 12AB – and were the first NJ plates to be issued with screened, rather than embossed, serials.

Other

References

External links
New Jersey license plates, 1969–present
Garden State Region of the Automobile License Plate Collectors Association

New Jersey
Transportation in New Jersey
New Jersey transportation-related lists
1908 establishments in New Jersey